Bruno Ravina (born March 24, 1984) is a Mauritian football player who currently plays for AS Port-Louis 2000 in the Mauritian Premier League and for the Mauritius national football team as a defender. He is featured on the Mauritian national team in the official 2010 FIFA World Cup video game.

International career

International goals
Scores and results list Mauritius' goal tally first.

References

External links 

1984 births
Living people
Mauritius international footballers
Mauritian footballers
Mauritian Premier League players
AS Port-Louis 2000 players
Association football defenders